The neutrinoless double beta decay (0νββ) is a commonly proposed and experimentally pursued theoretical radioactive decay process that would prove a Majorana nature of the neutrino particle. To this day, it has not been found.

The discovery of the neutrinoless double beta decay could shed light on the absolute neutrino masses and on their mass hierarchy (Neutrino mass). It would mean the first ever signal of the violation of total lepton number conservation. A Majorana nature of neutrinos would confirm that the neutrino is its own antiparticle.

To search for neutrinoless double beta decay, there are currently a number of experiments underway, with several future experiments for increased sensitivity proposed as well.

Historical development of the theoretical discussion 

In 1939, Wendell H. Furry proposed the idea of the Majorana nature of the neutrino, which was associated with beta decays. Furry stated the transition probability to even be higher for the neutrinoless double beta decay. It was the first idea proposed to search for the violation of lepton number conservation. It has, since then, drawn attention to it for being useful to study the nature of neutrinos (see quote).

The Italian physicist Ettore Majorana first introduced the concept of a particle being its own antiparticle. Particles' nature was subsequently named after him as Majorana particles. The neutrinoless double beta decay is one method to search for the possible Majorana nature of neutrinos.

Physical relevance

Conventional double beta decay 

Neutrinos are conventionally produced in weak decays. Weak beta decays normally produce one electron (or positron), emit an antineutrino (or neutrino) and increase the nucleus' proton number  by one. The nucleus' mass (i.e. binding energy) is then lower and thus more favorable. There exists a number of elements that can decay into a nucleus of lower mass, but they cannot emit one electron only because the resulting nucleus is kinematically (that is, in terms of energy) not favorable (its energy would be higher). These nuclei can only decay by emitting two electrons (that is, via double beta decay). There are about a dozen confirmed cases of nuclei that can only decay via double beta decay. The corresponding decay equation is:
.

It is a weak process of second order. A simultaneous decay of two nucleons in the same nucleus is extremely unlikely. Thus, the experimentally observed lifetimes of such decay processes are in the range of  years. A number of isotopes have been observed already to show this two-neutrino double beta decay.

This conventional double beta decay is allowed in the Standard Model of particle physics. It has thus both a theoretical and an experimental foundation.

Overview 

If the nature of the neutrinos is Majorana, then they can be emitted and absorbed in the same process without showing up in the corresponding final state. As Dirac particles, both the neutrinos produced by the decay of the W bosons would be emitted, and not absorbed after.

The neutrinoless double beta decay can only occur if
 the neutrino particle is Majorana, and
 there exists a right-handed component of the weak leptonic current or the neutrino can change its handedness between emission and absorption (between the two W vertices), which is possible for a non-zero neutrino mass (for at least one of the neutrino species).

The simplest decay process is known as the light neutrino exchange. It features one neutrino emitted by one nucleon and absorbed by another nucleon (see figure to the right). In the final state, the only remaining parts are the nucleus (with its changed proton number ) and two electrons:

The two electrons are emitted quasi-simultaneously.

The two resulting electrons are then the only emitted particles in the final state and must carry approximately the difference of the sums of the binding energies of the two nuclei before and after the process as their kinetic energy. The heavy nuclei do not carry significant kinetic energy. The electrons will be emitted back-to-back due to momentum conservation.

In that case, the decay rate can be calculated with
,
where  denotes the phase space factor,  the (squared) matrix element of this nuclear decay process (according to the Feynman diagram), and  the square of the effective Majorana mass.

First, the effective Majorana mass can be obtained by
,
where  are the Majorana neutrino masses (three neutrinos ) and  the elements of the neutrino mixing matrix  (see PMNS matrix). Contemporary experiments to find neutrinoless double beta decays (see section on experiments) aim at both the proof of the Majorana nature of neutrinos and the measurement of this effective Majorana mass  (can only be done if the decay is actually generated by the neutrino masses).

The nuclear matrix element (NME)  cannot be measured independently; it must, but also can, be calculated. The calculation itself relies on sophisticated nuclear many-body theories and there exist different methods to do this. The NME  differs also from nucleus to nucleus (i.e. chemical element to chemical element). Today, the calculation of the NME is a significant problem and it has been treated by different authors in different ways. Different approaches are being chosen here. The obtained values for  often vary by factors of 2 up to about 5. Typical values lie in the range of from about 0.9 to 14, depending on the decaying nucleus/element.

Lastly, the phase-space factor  must also be calculated. It depends on the total released kinetic energy (i.e. "-value") and the atomic number . Methods utilize Dirac wave functions, finite nuclear sizes and electron screening.

It is believed that, if neutrinoless double beta decay is found under certain conditions (decay rate compatible with predictions based on experimental knowledge about neutrino masses and mixing), this would indeed "likely" point at Majorana neutrinos as the main mediator (and not other sources of new physics). There are 35 nuclei that can undergo neutrinoless double beta decay (according to the aforementioned decay conditions).

Experiments and results 

Nine different candidates of nuclei are being considered in experiments to confirm neutrinoless double beta-decay: . They all have arguments for and against their use in an experiment. Factors to be included and revised are natural abundance, reasonably priced enrichment, and a well understood and controlled experimental technique. The higher the -value, the better are the chances of a discovery, in principle.

Experimentally of interest and thus measured is the sum of the kinetic energies of the two emitted electrons. It should equal the -value of the respective nucleus for neutrinoless double beta emission.

The table shows a summary of the currently best limits on the lifetime of 0νββ. From this, it can be deduced that neutrinoless double beta decay is an extremely rare process - if it occurs at all.

Heidelberg-Moscow collaboration 
The so-called "Heidelberg-Moscow collaboration" (HDM; 1990-2003) of the German Max-Planck-Institut für Kernphysik and the Russian science center Kurchatov Institute in Moscow famously claimed to have found "evidence for neutrinoless double beta decay" (Heidelberg-Moscow controversy). Initially, in 2001 the collaboration announced a 2.2σ, or a 3.1σ (depending on the used calculation method) evidence. The decay rate was found to be around  years. This result has been topic of discussions between many scientists and authors. To this day, no other experiment has ever confirmed or approved the result of the HDM group. Instead, recent results from the GERDA experiment for the lifetime limit clearly disfavor and reject the values of the HDM collaboration.

Neutrinoless double beta decay has not yet been found.

GERDA (Germanium Detector Array) experiment 
The GERDA collaboration's result of phase I of the detector was a limit of  years (90% C.L.). It used Germanium both as source and detector material. Liquid argon was used for muon vetoing and as a shielding from background radiation. The -value of Germanium for 0νββ decay is 2039 keV, but no excess of events in this region was found. Phase II of the experiment started data-taking in 2015, and it used around 36 kg of Germanium for the detectors. The exposure analyzed until July 2020 was 10.8 kg yr. Again, no signal was found and thus a new limit was set to  years (90% C.L.). The detector has stopped working and published its final results in December 2020. No neutrinoless double beta decay was observed.

EXO (Enriched Xenon Observatory) experiment 
The Enriched Xenon Observatory-200 experiment uses xenon both as source and detector. The experiment is located in New Mexico (US) and uses a time-projection chamber (TPC) for three-dimensional spatial and temporal resolution of the electron track depositions. The EXO-200 experiment yielded a lifetime limit of  years (90% C.L.). When translated to effective Majorana mass, this is a limit of the same order as that obtained by GERDA I and II.

Currently data-taking experiments 
 CUORE (Cryogenic Underground Observatory for Rare Events) experiment:
  The CUORE experiment consists of an array of 988 ultra-cold TeO2 crystals (for a total mass of 206 kg of ) used as bolometers to detect the emitted beta particles and as the source of the decay. CUORE is located underground at the Laboratori Nazionali del Gran Sasso, and it began its first physics data run in 2017. The experiment is steadily taking data, and it is expected to finalize its physics program by 2024.
 KamLAND-Zen (Kamioka Liquid Scintillator Antineutrino Detector-Zen) experiment:
 The KamLAND-Zen experiment commenced using 13 tons of xenon as a source (enriched with about 320 kg of ), contained in a nylon balloon that is surrounded by a liquid scintillator outer balloon of 13 m diameter. Starting in 2011, KamLAND-Zen Phase I started taking data, eventually leading to set a limit on the lifetime for neutrinoless double beta decay of  years (90% C.L.). This limit could be improved by combining with Phase II data (data-taking started in December 2013) to  years (90% C.L.).

Proposed/future experiments

nEXO experiment:
As EXO-200's successor, nEXO is planned to be a ton-scale experiment and part of the next generation of 0νββ experiments. The detector material is planned to weigh about 5 t, serving a 1% energy resolution at the -value. The experiment is planned to deliver a lifetime sensitivity of about  years after 10 years of data-taking.
LEGEND (experiment)
 SuperNEMO

Neutrinoless muon conversion 

See also 

 Double beta decay
 Heidelberg-Moscow controversy
 Neutrinoless double electron capture

References 

Nuclear physics
Standard Model
Physics beyond the Standard Model
Radioactivity
Hypothetical processes